Rob Ickes (born 1967) is an American dobro (resonator guitar) player in San Francisco, California. Ickes moved to Nashville in 1992 and joined the contemporary bluegrass band Blue Highway as a founding member in 1994. He currently collaborates with guitarist Trey Hensley, with whom he has released three albums. Ickes has been nominated for numerous Grammy Awards, winning two in 1994 for bluegrass and gospel albums he contributed to.

Biography
After spending 21 years as Blue Highway's dobro player, Ickes left the band in 2015. Currently, he records and performs with guitarist Trey Hensley. The duo has released three albums with Compass Records: World Full of Blues (2019), The Country Blues (2016), and Before the Sun Goes Down (2014). Before the Sun Goes Down was nominated for a Grammy in 2016.  As a duo, Ickes and Hensley have performed and recorded with Taj Mahal, Tommy Emmanuel, David Grisman, Molly Tuttle, and Jorma Kaukonen & Hot Tuna. 

In 2013, he was named Dobro Player of the Year for the fifteenth time by the International Bluegrass Music Association. IBMA notes that he is the most awarded instrumentalist in the history of the IBMA Awards. He was also named the USA Peter Cummings Fellow in 2010 by United States Artists, an organization that annually honors 50 of America's finest artists across eight disciplines.

In 2014, Ickes released an album with fellow dobro greats Jerry Douglas and Mike Auldridge, titled Three Bells. This album was nominated for a Grammy in 2015.  His other solo projects include Road Song, a jazz project with pianist Michael Alvey and vocalist Robinella (ResoRevolution),  and four solo albums on Rounder Records: Big Time (2004), What It Is (2002), Slide City (1999) and Hard Times (1997). Ickes has also performed and recorded with a "jamgrass acoustic power trio", Three Ring Circle, with Andy Leftwich and Dave Pomeroy. Three Ring Circle released a self-titled CD in 2006, (Earwave Records), followed by Brothership in 2010 (ResoRevolution). Ickes has also released a studio performance DVD+CD, Rob Ickes: Contemporary Dobro Artistry (2008, Mel Bay), featuring duos with mandolinist Andy Leftwich, solo performances, and duos with jazz pianist Michael Alvey.

Ickes was the youngest dobro player on The Great Dobro Sessions, produced by Jerry Douglas and Tut Taylor, which won the 1994 Grammy for Best Bluegrass Album. He was also on the Alison Krauss & The Cox Family album, I Know Who Holds Tomorrow, which won the 1994 Grammy for Best Southern Gospel.

He has also collaborated with a wide range of musicians, including Merle Haggard, Earl Scruggs, Tony Rice, Charlie Haden, David Grisman, Alison Krauss, Willie Nelson, David Lee Roth, Dolly Parton, Patty Loveless, Peter Rowan, Niall Toner, Claire Lynch, and Mary Chapin Carpenter and the southern gospel group The Dunaways.  His work with Merle Haggard includes Haggard's 2007 release, "The Bluegrass Sessions" (McCoury Music). Other notable collaborations include the CD Earl Scruggs with Family & Friends, The Ultimate Collection: Live at the Ryman (2008, Rounder), nominated for the 2009 Grammy for Best Bluegrass Album; and "Earl Scruggs, Doc Watson, Ricky Skaggs, The Three Pickers" (2003, Rounder DVD & CD), which appeared on the Billboard Bluegrass Chart for 138 weeks. Ickes also played on Mark Twain: Words & Music in 2011, a benefit CD for the Mark Twain Boyhood Home & Museum produced by Carl Jackson. The project featured Clint Eastwood, Jimmy Buffett, Garrison Keillor, Brad Paisley, Sheryl Crow, Vince Gill, Emmylou Harris, and others.

Active in dobro workshops and instruction, Ickes is the founder and producer of Resosummit, a 3-day educational event held in Nashville annually since 2007, with 100 students, 10+ faculty, and key luthiers, with workshops, master classes, and performances.  He frequently serves as an instructor at music workshops and camps, including NashCamp, Sore Fingers Week (UK), Rockygrass Academy (CO), Wintergrass Academy (WA), and Jorma Kaukonen's Fur Peace Ranch Guitar Camp (OH).

In 2019, Ickes began offering video instruction on Big Music Tent, an online music lessons platform. He uploads regular videos and interacts with dobro students on his dedicated learning page, "Rob's Reso Room."

References

External links
Rob Ickes Official site
Blue Highway Official site
ResoRevolution website
 NPR All Things Considered feature, "Dobro Player Rob Ickes Takes A New Highway"
Big Music Tent Website

Living people
American bluegrass musicians
Slide guitarists
1967 births
Blue Coast Records artists
Resonator guitarists
Grammy Award winners
Jazz musicians from Tennessee
Bluegrass musicians from Tennessee
Musicians from Nashville, Tennessee
Musicians from San Francisco